Claire Rafferty is a Northern Irish actress.
She studied drama at Queen's University Belfast (2000 – 2003) followed by London Academy of Music and Dramatic Art. On television, she played Anna Haldane in the first series of Shetland, Detective Constable Christine Larkin in The Fall series 2 and 3, Tabitha Richie (lead role) in Banged Up Abroad: Bogota Belly Bust, and deputy headmistress Miss Mooney in both series of Derry Girls.

Critical review
Her work on the stage has received critical appreciation:

Roles

References

External links 
 
 Claire Rafferty at United Agents

21st-century actresses from Northern Ireland
Actresses from Belfast
Alumni of Queen's University Belfast
Alumni of the London Academy of Music and Dramatic Art
Living people
Film actresses from Northern Ireland
Stage actresses from Northern Ireland
Television actresses from Northern Ireland
Year of birth missing (living people)